The following lists events from the year 2018 in Zimbabwe.

Incumbents
President: Emmerson Mnangagwa
First Vice President: Constantino Chiwenga 
Second Vice President: Kembo Mohadi
Chief Justice of Zimbabwe: Luke Malaba

Events

January
18 - President Mnagagwa announces that observer missions from the Commonwealth of Nations, the European Union, and the United Nations have been invited to monitor the 2018 general elections.

April
Sibusiso Moyo will be attending the Commonwealth Heads of Government Meeting 2018 as an observer, as Zimbabwe has an intention of reengaging with the international community - including a possible return of Zimbabwe to the Commonwealth of Nations during 2018.

July
 29 July – On the eve of Zimbabwe's election, Mugabe made a surprise press conference where he stated his wish not to vote for President  Mnangagwa and ZANU-PF, the party he founded
 Instead, he expressed his wish to vote his long time rival party, the MDC of Nelson Chamisa
.
 Zimbabwean general election, 2018 - to elect members of the House of Assembly of Zimbabwe and the Senate of Zimbabwe as well as the President of Zimbabwe.

Date unknown
President Mnangagwa has announced that Zimbabwe will seek a return to the Commonwealth, of which it was a full member from April 1980 to December 2003.

Deaths
14 February - Morgan Tsvangirai, 65, Zimbabwean politician and former Prime Minister of Zimbabwe.

References

 
2010s in Zimbabwe
Years of the 21st century in Zimbabwe